Elena Gaskell (born 17 September 2001) is a Canadian freestyle skier who competes internationally in the big air and slopestyle disciplines.

Career 
Gaskell joined the national team in 2016. At the first World Cup of the 2021-22 season, Gaskell took bronze in the big air event.

On January 24, 2022, Gaskell was named to Canada's 2022 Olympic team in the big air and slopestyle events. Gaskell did not compete however, as she sustained an injury in training at the games.

References

External links 
 

2001 births
Living people
Canadian female freestyle skiers
Sportspeople from Vernon, British Columbia